Mannekensvere is a small rural village in Belgium, located in the Polder region. Mannekensvere is a part ("deelgemeente") of the seaside municipality of Middelkerke. The village is located along the Yser river.

Mannekensvere was an independent municipality until 1971, when it became a part of the newly formed municipality Spermalie. In 1977, Spermalie was dissolved, and Mannekensvere was added to Middelkerke.

Populated places in West Flanders
Sub-municipalities of Middelkerke